Kovlands Ishockeyförening (also called Kovland Hockey, abbreviated "Kovlands IshF" or "KIF") is a Swedish ice hockey club founded in 2000 when the ice hockey section of Kovlands IF split off to form an independent club. The team played in Hockeyettan, the third tier of ice hockey in Sweden, but withdrew from the league in 2016 for play in lower divisions for financial reasons.

References

External links
 Official website
 Profile on Eliteprospects.com

Ice hockey teams in Sweden
Ice hockey clubs established in 2000
Ice hockey teams in Västernorrland County